Luigi De Manincor (Rovinj, 14 July 1910 – 13 February 1986) was an Italian sailor who competed in the 1936 Summer Olympics and in the 1948 Summer Olympics.

In 1936 he was a crew member of the Italian boat Italia which won the gold medal in the 8 metre class competition.

In 1948 he finished fifth as a crew member of the Italian boat Ausonia in the Dragon.

References

External links
 
 
 
 

1910 births
1986 deaths
Italian male sailors (sport)
Olympic sailors of Italy
Olympic gold medalists for Italy
Olympic medalists in sailing
Sailors at the 1936 Summer Olympics – 8 Metre
Sailors at the 1948 Summer Olympics – Dragon
Medalists at the 1936 Summer Olympics
Sailors of Marina Militare